In the 2001–02 season, Shelbourne were crowned eircom League Premier Division champions.

Managerial/backroom staff
Manager: Dermot Keely
Caretaker Managers: Noel King, Alan Mathews (November 2001 to February 2002)
Assistant Manager: Alan Mathews

2001–02 squad members

 (Captain)

Results/league tables

eircom League Premier Division

Final league table

League Results summary

League Form/Results by round

UEFA Cup

Qualifying Round

Brøndby IF won 5 – 0 on aggregate

FAI Cup

Second round

Third round

League Cup

First round

FAI Super Cup

2001–02 Season Statistics

Player appearances/goals
As of March 31, 2002.

|}

Top goalscorers

Notes

References

Shelbourne F.C. seasons
Shelbourne
Shelbourne